Jerry Franklin is an American football linebacker.

Jerry Franklin may also refer to:

Jerry Franklin (CEO), President of CPTV
Jerry Franklin (scientist), see Scientific Integrity in Policymaking

See also
Jeremy Franklin, Stargate Universe character